It Can Happen Here: White Power and the Rising Threat of Genocide in the U.S. is a 2021 book by anthropologist Alexander Laban Hinton and published by New York University Press. Hinton argued that "there is a real risk of violent atrocities happening in the United States".

References

2021 non-fiction books
New York University Press books
Books about race and ethnicity
White supremacy in the United States